Floyd K. Roland (born November 23, 1961) is a politician from Northwest Territories, Canada. He was the 11th premier of the Northwest Territories, having held office from October 17, 2007 to October 26, 2011.

Previously a town councillor and deputy mayor of Inuvik, Roland was first elected to the Legislative Assembly in the 1995 Northwest Territories general election, after defeating the incumbent candidate Fred Koe. He was re-elected in the 1999 Northwest Territories general election, winning in a landslide with 83% of the vote.

Roland was returned by acclamation in the 2003 Northwest Territories general election and acclaimed for a second time in the 2007 Northwest Territories general election, following which the members of the Legislature elected him Premier of the Northwest Territories on October 17, 2007.

His government survived a historic vote of no confidence on February 6, 2009 by a vote of 10 to 8, following allegations by a number of MLAs that he was refusing to communicate with them on major policy decisions, including changes to the territory's health benefits policy, a $34-million loan given to Discovery Air, approval of the $165-million Deh Cho Bridge, and plans to amalgamate a number of public services boards.

He faced renewed controversy in May 2009 when the territorial conflict of interest commissioner, Gerald Gerrand, ruled that there were reasonable grounds to believe that the affair constituted a breach of Roland's duties of office, including not-yet-confirmed allegations that Russell passed on confidential information from legislative committee meetings to Roland.

Roland unsuccessfully ran in the 2015 federal election and is formerly President of the Western Arctic Conservative Association.

Electoral history

2007 election

In this election, no other candidate registered to run for this riding, so Floyd Roland was returned by acclamation.

2003 election

In this election, no other candidate registered for this riding, so Floyd Roland was returned by acclamation.

1999 election

References

External links
Floyd Roland
 

1961 births
Premiers of the Northwest Territories
Living people
People from Inuvik
Deputy premiers of the Northwest Territories
Conservative Party of Canada candidates for the Canadian House of Commons